¡Vivan los niños! (English: Long live the children!) is a Mexican telenovela (Soap Opera) produced by Nicandro Díaz González for Televisa. It aired on Canal de las Estrellas from July 15, 2002, to March 17, 2003. It's an adaptation of the 1983 Argentinean telenovela Señorita maestra (based on the original version also 1974 Argentinean telenovela, Jacinta Pichimahuida).

Andrea Legarreta and Eduardo Capetillo starred as protagonists, Daniela Aedo, Óscar Alberto López, Natalia Juárez, Christian Stanley, Andrés Márquez,Valentina Cuenca,Nicole Durazo and Juan de Dios Martín starred as child protagonists, while Alejandra Procuna starred as main antagonist.

Plot
Lupita Gómez is a young teacher who recently left her people to go to work in Mexico City at the "Patria Unida" school, as recommended by her godfather Don Joaquín. There, she becomes a 2nd grade teacher. Lupita meets a group of children in her class whom she begins to adore. Her relationship with the children sends the cast on a series of comedic adventures.

Cast
 
Andrea Legarreta as Guadalupe "Lupita" Gómez Díaz
Eduardo Capetillo as Emiliano Leal
Miguel de León as Alonso Gallardo
Joaquín Cordero as Don Joaquín Castillo
Ignacio López Tarso as Don Ignacio Robles
Raquel Olmedo as Director Alarica Caradura
Renata Flores as Segismunda Verrugita/Rosamunda Cocoshka
Manuel Saval as Fernando Molina
Rebeca Mankita as Paola de Molina
Isabel Martínez "La Tarabilla" as Francisca "Pancha"
Raúl Padilla "Chóforo" as Felipe Gómez
Miguel Galván as Primitivo Batalla
Adriana Acosta as Graciela "Chela" de Batalla
Alejandro Ruiz as Julián Castillo
Zaide Silvia Gutiérrez as Estela de Castillo
Nicky Mondellini as Sofía de Luna
Eduardo Rodríguez as Gerardo Luna
Daniela Aedo as Marisol Luna
Natalia Juárez as Simoneta Molina
Óscar Alberto López as Diego Loyola Iturralde
Valentina Cuenca as Citlali Castillo
Christian Stanley as Ángel Bueno Piña
Andrés Márquez as Lucas Batalla
Ana Paulina Cáceres as Polita Valle de la Rionda
Nicole Durazo as Brisa Bravo
Juan de Dios Martín as Damián Bravo
Kevin Hung as Yuyi Wong
Brayam Alejandro as Guillermo "Memo" Sánchez Palacios
Valeria López as Wendy Anderson
Raúl Sebastián as Santiago Valderrama
Rafael Banquells Jr. as Othon Valle de la Rionda
Hendrik Marine as Rodrigo Ricardi
Juan Ignacio Aranda as Ricardo Ricardi
Susan Vohn as Greta de Ricardi
Jaime Garza as Juan Sánchez/Joanina Dulcinea
Esther Rinaldi as Micaela Palacios de Sánchez
Danna Paola as Estrella Herrera
Yolanda Ventura as Dolores Herrera
David Ostrosky as Dr. Bernardo Arias
Beatriz Sheridan as Inspector Severina Estudillo
Manuel "El Loco" Valdés as Polidoro
Yuri as Regina Noriega
Héctor Sáez as Dr. Elpidio
Dacia González as Perpetua
Jorge de Silva as Horacio
Karla Álvarez as Jacinta Durán
Roberto Palazuelos as Pantaleón Rendón
Andrea Lagunes as Miranda Gallardo Noriega
Anadela Losada as Carolina Muñiz
Anastasia Acosta as Dalia
Vielka Valenzuela as Valeria
Jacqueline Arroyo as Thelma
Aurora Molina as Eduviges
Norma Lazareno as Adelina
Elizabeth Dupeyrón as Fabiola Vda. de Robles
Alejandra Procuna as Diamantina Robles
Silvia Caos as Doña Porfiria Palacios
Julio Vega as Garrido
Guillermo Rivas as Eladio
Violeta Isfel as Florencia Paz Ferrer
Rosita Pelayo as Artemisa
Zully Keith as Nina
Martin Lazareno as Rubén
Ricardo Chávez as Uriel
Adalberto Martínez "Resortes" as Vagabundo
Julio Monterde as Father Domingo
Jacqueline Voltaire as Ballet's Director
Lorena Velázquez as Donatella
Rafael del Villar as Dolores's husband
Lalo "El Mimo" as Mustafa
Mario Carballido as Bruno
Humberto Elizondo as Juez Mazagatos
Maria Luisa Alcala as Mr. Alatriste's housekeeper
Juan Carlos Serrán as Pietro Mortadello
María Rubio as Mrs. Arredondo
Julio Camejo as Científico
René Casados as Mr. Cuéllar
Jorge Van Rankin as Zopenko Karambasoft
Jacqueline Bracamontes as The Fairy Treasures
Claudia Ortega as Brigida
Juan Carlos Casasola as Secundino
Juan Ferrara as Mauricio Borbolla
Katie Barberi as Dorina
Juan Peláez as Lic. Arredondo
Verónica Macías as Lic. Arredondo's secretary
Lisette Morelos as Adriana Espinoza
Raúl Magaña as Fabián Espinoza
Aarón Hernán as Notario Sotomayor
Marisol Mijares as Ines
Amparo Garrido as Doña Luz
Teo Tapia as Gerente Cardenas
Claudio Báez as Evaristo Leal
Lupita Lara as Cayetana Rubio de Leal
Alejandro Ibarra as Octavio
Anabel Gutiérrez as Pordiosera
Juan Verduzco as Juez Tirado
Archie Lafranco as Dimitri
Jorge "Maromero" Páez as himself

References

External links

 at esmas.com 

2002 telenovelas
Mexican telenovelas
2002 Mexican television series debuts
2003 Mexican television series endings
Television shows set in Mexico
Televisa telenovelas
Children's telenovelas
Mexican television series based on Argentine television series
Spanish-language telenovelas
Television series about children
Television series about educators